The 4th Asian Cross Country Championships took place 1997 in Chiba, Japan.

Medalists

Medal table

References
Results

Asian Cross Country Championships
Asian Cross Country
Asian Cross Country
Asian Cross Country
Sport in Chiba (city)
International athletics competitions hosted by Japan